14 Arietis (abbreviated 14 Ari) is a star in the constellation of Aries. 14 Arietis is the Flamsteed designation. It has an apparent visual magnitude of 4.98, which means it is visible to the naked eye.

This is an astrometric binary system. The primary has a stellar classification of F2 III, suggesting that it is a giant star. Despite being an evolved star with four times the radius of the Sun, it is spinning rapidly with a projected rotational velocity of 139.6 km/s. This is causing a pronounced equatorial bulge, with the radius of the star along the equator being 24% greater than the radius at the poles. The star shines at 32 times the luminosity of the Sun, with this energy being radiated from its outer atmosphere at an effective temperature of 6,761 K. This heat gives it the yellow-white hued glow of an F-type star.

References

External links
Aladin previewer
Aladin sky atlas
 HR 623

Arietis, 14
013174
010053
0623
F-type giants
Aries (constellation)
Astrometric binaries
Durchmusterung objects